Thalassoma newtoni is a species of marine fish in the family Labridae, the wrasses. It occurs in the waters around São Tomé and Príncipe, and possibly along the West African coast between Ghana and Angola.

References

newtoni
Fish of Africa
Fish described in 1891